The 1914–15 season was Galatasaray SK's 11th in existence and the club's 7th consecutive season in the IFL.

Squad statistics

Competitions

İstanbul Football League

Standings

Matches

Final Match
Kick-off listed in local time (EEST)

Friendly Matches
Kick-off listed in local time (EEST)

References
 Futbol vol.2, Galatasaray. Tercüman Spor Ansiklopedisi.(1981) (page 555-556)

External links
 Galatasaray Sports Club Official Website 
 Turkish Football Federation - Galatasaray A.Ş. 
 uefa.com - Galatasaray AŞ

Galatasaray S.K. (football) seasons
Turkish football clubs 1914–15 season
1910s in Istanbul